The Girl with the Mask is a 1922 German silent comedy film directed by Victor Janson and starring Ossi Oswalda, Paul Biensfeldt, and Hermann Thimig.

The film's sets were designed by the art director Kurt Richter.

Cast

References

Bibliography

External links

1922 films
Films of the Weimar Republic
German silent feature films
Films directed by Victor Janson
German black-and-white films
UFA GmbH films
German comedy films
1922 comedy films
Silent comedy films
1920s German films